Monica H. Green is an author and a historian who was a professor of history at Arizona State University. She is an expert in the history of women's health care in premodern Europe, medicine and gender, and she specialises in the history of infectious diseases in the pre-modern period.

Education 
Green earned an A.B. degree from Barnard College in 1978, and a master's (1981) and a Ph.D. from Princeton University in 1985. Her doctoral thesis was entitled, The Transmission of Ancient Theories of Female Physiology and Disease Through the Early Middle Ages.

Career
Green was a lecturer at Princeton University 1983–1985. She was a postdoctoral fellow and visiting lecturer, at University of North Carolina, Chapel Hill, 1985–1987. She was then appointed to assistant professor of history at Duke University in 1987, and was promoted to associate professor of history in 1995. In 2001 she was appointed professor of history at Arizona State University. From December 2019 onwards, she has been continuing her work as an independent scholar.

She was a fellow at the Radcliffe Institute for Advanced Study, 2001–2002. Green held an American Council of Learned Societies Fellowship in 2009. Her project was entitled The Midwife, the Surgeon, and the Lawyer: The Intersections of Obstetrics and Law to 1800. She held a visiting fellowship at All Souls College, Oxford University, 2009–10. She was a fellow at the Institute of Advanced Study, Princeton University, 1990–92 and 2013–14. She was a visiting fellow in medieval studies at Fordham University in 2013.

Green edited the first volume of the Journal, The Medieval Globe, in 2015 when the journal launched, and she is on the editorial board. She often is called upon by media outlets such as The Washington Post to discuss pandemics and the spread of disease.

In December 2020, The Four Black Deaths by Green was published in the American Historical Review. In the article she documents historical records suggesting that the second documented pandemic of bubonic plague may have begun in the 1200s A.D. rather than the 1300s.

Honors
In 2004, Green was co-winner of the John Nicholas Brown Prize, awarded by the Medieval Academy of America for her book, Women's Healthcare in the Medieval West: Texts and Contexts (Ashgate, 2000). In 2009 Green was awarded the Margaret W. Rossiter History of Women in Science Prize, awarded by the History of Science Society for the best book on the history of women in science for her book, Making Women's Medicine Masculine: The Rise of Male Authority in Pre-Modern Gynaecology (Oxford University Press, 2008).

In 2011 Green was elected as fellow to the Medieval Academy of America. In 2014, Green was awarded the Joseph H. Hazen Education Prize in recognition of outstanding contributions to the teaching of history of science by the History of Science Society. In 2015 she won a Berlin Prize Fellowship. In 2018, Green was awarded the prestigious CARA Award for Excellence in Teaching Medieval Studies by the Medieval Academy of America. She gave the Society for Medieval Archaeology 2019 Annual Conference Keynote with the lecture'The Historian, the Archaeologist, and the Geneticist: Pandemic Thinking.

In 2021, during the Covid-19 pandemic, the Medieval Academy of America announced the new Monica H. Green Prize for Distinguished Medieval Research, which is an annual award for medieval research showing the value of medieval studies in modern life, honouring Prof. Green's long-term works in medieval disease and pandemic.

Family 
Green's father is Marlon Green, a pilot whose landmark United States Supreme Court decision in 1963 helped dismantle racial discrimination in the American passenger airline industry.

Selected works
 'When Numbers Don't Count: Changing Perspectives on the Justianic Plague', Eidolon, 18 November 2019, https://eidolon.pub/when-numbers-dont-count-56a2b3c3d07
(ed.) Pandemic Disease in the Medieval World: Rethinking the Black Death (Kalamazoo : Arc Medieval Press, 2015)
Making Women’s Medicine Masculine: The Rise of Male Authority in Pre-Modern Gynaecology. Oxford: Oxford University Press, 2008.  (awarded the 2009 Margaret W. Rossiter History of Women in Science Prize by the History of Science Society)
'Conversing with the Minority: Relations Among Christian, Jewish, and Muslim Women in the High Middle Ages', Journal of Medieval History, 34, no 2 (2008)
 The ‘Trotula’: A Medieval Compendium of Women’s Medicine. Philadelphia: University of Pennsylvania Press, 2001. 
 Women’s Healthcare in the Medieval West: Texts and Contexts, Variorum Collected Studies Series, CS680. Aldershot: Ashgate, 2000.

References

External links 
Google Scholar Citations
Orcid ID Page: http://orcid.org/0000-0001-8978-9631

Year of birth missing (living people)
Living people
American medievalists
Women medievalists
Arizona State University faculty
American women historians
Barnard College alumni
Princeton University alumni
Fellows of the Medieval Academy of America
21st-century American women